The Destined One, is a reality dating show, for each episode, four local celebrities are invited to play matchmaker and a group of 10 men and women will attempt to find the right match.

Format
In each episode, four men or women will be hidden from view as the "fated persons (有缘人)". The remaining six men or women stand at the podium to award points (1 to 10) to all the fated persons based on star matchmakers' recommendations and interactions with the fated persons.

There is a total of 5 rounds at each round, and one fated person with the lowest point will be eliminated from the round. 
In the 1st round, the star matchmakers will introduce the fated persons and make their recommendations.
In the 2nd round, it is a question and answers round between the fated persons and the participants at the podium.
In the 3rd round, the remaining two fated persons will perform their talent.
In the 4th round, the last fated person will ask the participants at the podium some questions before finalizing the choice.
In the 5th round, the fated person will have the chance to choose and confess to his/her ideal match chosen from the podium.
The chosen man/woman will have to decide to accept or reject the fated person. If accepted, it will be a successful match and if rejected, it will be an unsuccessful match.

Controversy
It was alleged that one of the lady participants was already attached during the show and was successfully matched to a restaurant owner. This raise question on the selection of the participants and the show might go against what it set out to achieve.

Star Matchmakers

Male Star
 Ben Yeo - Episode 3
 Brandon Wong (actor) - Episode 6
 Cavin Soh - Episode 3
 Jeremy Chan - Episode 4
 Lee Teng - Episode 1 | 2 | 6 | 7
 Marcus Chin - Episode 1
 Mark Lee - Episode 5
 Shane Pow - Episode 7
 Yao Wenlong - Episode 2

Female Star
 Aileen Tan - Episode 1
 Kym Ng - Episode 3, 5 & 7
 Lina Ng  - Episode 4 & 6
 Liu Ling Ling - Episode 4
 Priscelia Chan - Episode 6
 Pan Lingling - Episode 4
 Quan Yi Fong - Episode 5
 Vivian Lai - Episode 1 | 3 | 4 | 5 | 7
 Zoe Tay - Episode 2

See also
 List of variety and infotainment programmes broadcast by MediaCorp Channel 8
 Media of Singapore

References

External links
Official website

Singaporean television series